Magdalena Zděnovcová (born 17 May 1978) is a former Czech tennis player.

Zděnovcová, who won a total of eleven ITF tournaments in her career, reached a singles ranking high of world number 195 in September 2003.

ITF finals

Singles (3–10)

Doubles (8–9)

External links
 
 

1978 births
Living people
Czech female tennis players